Shiga is a Japanese surname. Notable people with the surname include:

, Japanese ice hockey player
Akiko Shiga (志賀 暁子, 19101990), Japanese actress
, Japanese ice hockey player
, better known as Tochiazuma Daisuke, Japanese sumo wrestler
Jason Shiga (born 1976), American cartoonist
, Japanese physician and bacteriologist
, Japanese idol and voice actress
, Japanese basketball player
, Japanese writer
, Japanese handball player 

Japanese-language surnames